This is a list of the first women lawyer(s) and judge(s) in Nevada. It includes the year in which the women were admitted to practice law (in parentheses). Also included are women who achieved other distinctions such becoming the first in their state to graduate from law school or become a political figure.

Firsts in Nevada's history

Lawyers 

First female (admitted): Laura May Tilden Wilson (1893)  
 First female (actively practice): Georgia J. Johnson Dooley (1898) 
First female (employed by U.S. Commissioner): Anna M. Warren (1899) in 1913 
First native-born and Jewish American female: Felice Cohn (1902) 
First African American females: Johnnie B. Rawlinson and Viveca Monet Woods (1980)

Law Clerk 

 First female law clerk for the Supreme Court of Nevada: Rose Bird (c. 1965)

State judges 

 First female (municipal court): Robin A. Wright (1979) in 1981 
 First female (district court): Miriam Shearing (1969) in 1983  
 First female (Supreme Court of Nevada; Chief Justice): Miriam Shearing (1969) during tenure of 1993-2005 
 First African American female (any court level): Karen P. Bennett-Haron (1989) in 2002
 First Asian American female: Miranda Du (1994) 
 First openly lesbian female (Nevada Supreme Court): Lidia S. Stiglich (2008) in 2016  
 First African American female (state court): Tierra Jones in 2017  
 First female (Chief Judge; Nevada Court of Appeals): Abbi Silver (1990) in 2017 
 First Korean American (female) (Eighth Judicial District Court): Soonhee "Sunny" Bailey in 2021 
 First African American and Asian American female (Supreme Court of Nevada): Patricia Lee in 2022

Federal judges 
 First female (U.S. Magistrate Judge of the District of Nevada): Phyllis H. Atkins (1966) in 1980  
 First female (U.S. Bankruptcy Court): Linda B. Riegle (1978) in 1988  
 First African American female (U.S. District Court for the District of Nevada):Johnnie B. Rawlinson (1980) in 1998  
 First African American female (U.S. Court of Appeals for the Ninth Circuit): Johnnie B. Rawlinson (1980) in 2000 
 First Hispanic American female (U.S. District Court for the District of Nevada): Gloria Navarro (1994) in 2010 
First Asian American female (U.S. District Court for the District of Nevada): Miranda Du (1994) in 2012

Attorney General of Nevada 

 First female: Frankie Sue Del Papa (1974) in 1990 
 First Latino American female: Catherine Cortez Masto in 2007

Assistant Attorney General 

 First female: Felice Cohn (1902)

Federal Public Defender 

 First female: Franny A. Forsman (1977) in 1989

United States Attorney 

 First female: Kathryn E. Landreth (1981) from 1993-2001 
 First Latino American (female) (Chief of the Criminal Division for the U.S. Attorney’s Office for the District of Nevada): Cristina D. Silva

Public Defender 

 First female: Terri Steik Roeser (1981) in 1987

District Attorney 

 First female: Edna C. Plummer (1907) in 1918 
 First females (elected): Eileen Barnett (1979) and Virginia R. Shane (1980) 
First female (serve for three counties): Patricia Dillon Cafferata

City Attorney 

 First female: Patricia A. Lynch (1973) in 1987 
First African American (female): Sandra Morgan

Political Office 

 First female (Secretary of State of Nevada): Frankie Sue Del Papa (1974) from 1987-1991 
First Latino American female (Senate): Catherine Cortez Masto (1990) in 2017

Nevada State Bar Association

 First female president: Margo Piscevich from 1994-1995

Firsts in local history
 Patricia Dillon Cafferata: First female to serve as the District Attorney for Esmeralda, Lander and Lincoln Counties, Nevada
 Sanaz "Sunny" K. Soltani: First female to serve as the City Attorney for Carson City, Nevada
 Emilie N. Wanderer (1947): First female lawyer in Las Vegas, Nevada [Clark County, Nevada]
Miriam Shearing (1969): First female elected Justice of the Peace in Las Vegas, Nevada (Clark County, Nevada; 1976)
Camara Banfield: First African American (female) to serve as a Judge of the Clark County Superior Court (2021)
Tsering Cornell: First Asian American (female of Tibetan descent) judge in Clark County, Nevada (2022)
Sandra Morgan: First African American female (and African American in general) to serve as a City Attorney in North Las Vegas [Clark County, Nevada]
Sally Loehrer: First female President of the Clark County Bar Association in Nevada (1985)
 Catherine Ramsey: First female elected judge in Las Vegas, Nevada (Clark County, Nevada; 2011)
 Diana Hampton: First female elected Judge of the Henderson Municipal Court (Clark County, Nevada; 2005)
 Tierra Jones: First African American female to serve on the Clark County District Court (2017)
 Dee Butler: First African American (female) judge in Clark County District Court’s Family Division
Bita Yeager: First Asian American (female) appointed to the Las Vegas Justice Court [Clark County, Nevada]
Leah Chan Grinvald: First Asian American (female) to serve as the Dean of the William S. Boyd School of Law (2022)
Nancy Rey Jackson: First female to sit as a sworn judge of a Douglas County court (2004)
Nancy Porter (1989): First female judge in Elko County, Nevada
Edna C. Plummer (1907): First female District Attorney of Eureka County, Nevada (1918)
Gemma Greene Waldron: First African American female lawyer in Reno, Nevada [Washoe County, Nevada]
 Deborah A. Agosti and Robin A. Wright: First females elected as Judges of the Washoe County District Court (1985)
Shirley Smith: First female President of the Washoe County Bar Association in Nevada (1985)
Patricia A. Lynch (1973): First female to serve as the City Attorney for Reno, Nevada (1987) [Washoe County, Nevada]

See also  

 List of first women lawyers and judges in the United States
 Timeline of women lawyers in the United States
 Women in law

Other topics of interest 

 List of first minority male lawyers and judges in the United States
 List of first minority male lawyers and judges in Nevada

References 

Lawyers, Nevada, first
Nevada, first
Women, Nevada, first
Women, Nevada, first
Women in Nevada
Nevada lawyers
Lists of people from Nevada